Peeter Luksep (29 January 1955 – 8 September 2015) was a Swedish politician of Estonian descent, most notable for being a member of the Swedish Parliament for the Moderate Party from 1991 to 1994.

Luksep was born in Hammarby and began his studies at the Stockholm School of Economics in 1974. He earned a business degree in 1981 and received the title of Master of Business Administration.

He was an MP for the Moderate Party between 1991 and 1994 and deputy director at the V&S Group. He was also one of the elected officials abroad to support the Congress of Estonia. He died in Stockholm in 2015.

Awards
The Order for Merit to Lithuania (Lithuanian: Ordinas Už nuopelnus Lietuvai)

References

1955 births
2015 deaths
Swedish politicians
Swedish people of Estonian descent
Recipients of the Order of the White Star, 3rd Class